Evenlode is a village and civil parish in Gloucestershire, England.

Evenlode may also refer to:
 River Evenlode, in the Cotswolds in southern England
 HMS Evenlode (K300), 1942 River-class frigates
 SS Empire Evenlode, 1946–1949 name of SS Talthybius, cargo liner